New York Confidential may refer to:
New York Confidential, a book by Jack Lait and Lee Mortimer
New York Confidential (film), a 1955 film adaptation
New York Confidential (TV series), a 1958 TV series adaptation